Leslie Amoils is a bridge player.

Bridge accomplishments

Wins

 North American Bridge Championships (2)
 Rockwell Mixed Pairs (1) 1998 
 Vanderbilt (1) 2012

Runners-up

 North American Bridge Championships (2)
 Spingold (1) 2013 
 Vanderbilt (1) 2011

Notes

External links

Living people
Year of birth missing (living people)